Pierre Browne (born January 14, 1980) is a Canadian sprinter of Barbadian descent. He represented Canada for the 100 and the 200 meters dash in the 2000 Sydney Olympics, 2002 Commonwealth Games, and the 2004 and 2008 Summer Olympics.

Biography
Browne is the son of Victor and Maisie Browne and father of Alexander Browne. He was born and raised in Toronto, Ontario. He attended Victoria Park Collegiate Institute (formerly known as Victoria Park Secondary School) and graduated in 1998. He won his first gold medal in 1998 in the OFSAA 100 and 200 m dashes. During his years at Victoria Park Collegiate Institute, his coach, Kurt McIntosh personally coached Pierre. After graduating from Victoria Park Collegiate Institute, he attended the Mississippi State University, where he was the best freshman sprinter. He first came into the professional scene in the 2000 NCAA South East Conference. That year, he beat two-time defending champion Nicolas Macrozonaris by half a second and he posted his personal best in the 200 m dash of 20.49 seconds.

Browne represented Canada at the 2008 Summer Olympics in Beijing, where he competed at the 100 m sprint and placed 2nd in his heat after Michael Frater in a time of 10.22 seconds. He qualified for the second round in which he failed to qualify for the semi finals, as he placed sixth in his heat with a time 10.36 seconds. Together with Hank Palmer, Anson Henry and Jared Connaughton he also competed at the 4 × 100 m relay. In their qualification heat they placed second behind Jamaica, but in front of Germany and China. Their time of 38.77 was the fourth out of sixteen participating nations in the first round and they qualified for the final. There they sprinted to a time of 38.66 seconds, which was the sixth time.

Achievements

2004
Olympic Games, Athens  GRE (4 × 100 m)                    38.64
Olympic Games, Athens  GRE (100 m)                      10.21
Canadian Championships, Victoria, BC  CAN (200 m)       20.67
Canadian Championships, Victoria, BC  CAN (100 m)       10.13
Modesto Relays, Modesto, CA  USA (4 × 100 m)              39.28
Modesto Relays, Modesto, CA  USA (100 m)                10.19
Texas Relays, Austin, TX  USA (100 m)                   10.22
Penn Relays, Philadelphia, PA  USA (4 × 100 m)            39.44

2003
Texas Relays Track Meet, Texas  USA (100 m)             10.09w
Canadian Championships, Victoria, BC  CAN (100 m)       10.16
NCAA Championships, Sacramento, CA  USA (100 m)         10.34
NCAA Championships, Sacramento, CA  USA (200 m)         20.95
World Championships, Paris  FRA (4 × 100 m)               38.66
Penn Relays, Philadelphia, PA  USA (4 × 100 m)            39.20

2002
Canadian Championships, Edmonton, AB  CAN (100 m)       9.98w
Canadian Champs, Edmonton, AB  CAN (200 m)              20.80
Commonwealth Games, Manchester  ENG (100 m)             10.12
SEC Starkville, MS  USA (100 m) 1 10.13
NCAA Championships, Baton Rouge, LA  USA (100 m)        10.22
SEC Starkville MS  USA (200 m)                          20.41
NCAA Championships, Baton Rouge, LA  USA (200 m)        20.83

2001
Waco Invitational, Waco, TX  USA (200 m)                20.57
Texas Relay, Austin, TX  USA (100 m)                    10.19
Baton Rouge, LA  USA (60 m)                             6.77

2000
Olympic Games, Sydney  AUS (200 m)                      21.28
Olympic Games, Sydney  AUS (4 × 100 m)                    38.92
Canadian Championships, Victoria, BC  CAN (100 m)       10.24
Canadian Championships, Victoria, BC  CAN (200 m)       20.58w
SEC Championships, Baton Rouge, LA  USA (100 m)         10.24
SEC Championships, Baton Rouge, LA  USA (200 m)         20.49

External links

References

1980 births
Living people
Athletes (track and field) at the 2000 Summer Olympics
Athletes (track and field) at the 2002 Commonwealth Games
Athletes (track and field) at the 2004 Summer Olympics
Athletes (track and field) at the 2006 Commonwealth Games
Athletes (track and field) at the 2008 Summer Olympics
Canadian people of Barbadian descent
Canadian male sprinters
Olympic track and field athletes of Canada
Athletes from Toronto
Commonwealth Games medallists in athletics
Commonwealth Games bronze medallists for Canada
Medallists at the 2002 Commonwealth Games